is a compilation album by Japanese singer Yōko Oginome. Released through Victor Entertainment on September 16, 2009, as part of Oginome's 25th solo career anniversary, the album compiles her singles from 1985 to 1992.

The album peaked at No. 117 on Oricon's albums chart.

Track listing

Charts

References

External links
 
 
 

2009 compilation albums
Yōko Oginome compilation albums
Japanese-language compilation albums
Victor Entertainment compilation albums